Diane Hoskins is an American businessperson and architect who currently serves as a Co-CEO of Gensler, the world's largest revenue-generating architecture firm, alongside Co-CEO Andy Cohen. She is also on the board of directors for Boston Properties. Hoskins has been covered by The Washington Post Magazine, Fortune, Business Insider and other news sources as one of the most influential and powerful women in business.

Hoskins, who was appointed to chief executive in 2005, is one of the Co-CEOs credited with taking the firm from being one of the largest architecture firms in the United States to the largest in the world. Hoskins also founded the Gensler Research Institute in 2005.

Early life and education
Hoskins grew up in Chicago. She attributes her decision to pursue architecture and design to the impression that the Chicago skyline made on her during her early years."

Hoskins received her undergraduate degree in architecture from MIT in 1979. For her graduate studies, Hoskins completed a Master of Business Administration from the Anderson School of Business at UCLA. In an interview with Glassdoor in 2017, she explained how the pedagogy of MIT's architecture program at the time which focused on human-centered design impacted her thinking about the importance of designing with users in mind. She also credited a course on managerial psychology at MIT's Sloan School of Management for sparking her interest in workplace design and behavior.

Career
Before coming to Gensler, she held senior roles at Skidmore, Owings & Merrill, Epstein Architecture and Engineering, and Olympia & York. Diane joined Gensler in 1994 and was appointed to Co-CEO in 2005, the same year she founded the Gensler Research Institute. Under her leadership, Gensler became the world's first architecture and design firm to reach $1 billion in total annual revenue.

Projects 

 Facebook Headquarters. Menlo Park, California.
 Microsoft headquarters. Ireland.
 Shanghai Tower. Shanghai, China.
 Ford Foundation Center. New York, New York.

References 

Living people
21st-century American businesswomen
21st-century American businesspeople
Year of birth missing (living people)
Place of birth missing (living people)